The 1996 Colorado Buffaloes football team represented the University of Colorado at Boulder during the 1996 NCAA Division I-A football season. The team played their home games at Folsom Field in Boulder, Colorado. They participated in the Big 12 Conference in the North Division. They were coached by head coach Rick Neuheisel.

With the bowl victory, Colorado recorded its third straight 10-win season for the first time in school history.

Schedule

Roster

References

Colorado
Colorado Buffaloes football seasons
Holiday Bowl champion seasons
Colorado Buffaloes football